The 2021 Caribbean Series (Serie del Caribe) was the 63rd edition of the international competition featuring the champions of the Colombian Professional Baseball League, Dominican Professional Baseball League, Mexican Pacific League, Panamanian Professional Baseball League, Puerto Rican Professional Baseball League, and Venezuelan Professional Baseball League. It took place from January 31 to February 6, 2021 at Estadio Teodoro Mariscal in Mazatlán, Mexico.

Spectators were allowed to attend games, though the stadium only operated at 45% of capacity due to COVID-19 restrictions. Face coverings and socially distanced seating guidelines were enforced.

Format
The Preliminary Round consisted of a fifteen-game round robin, after which the top 4 teams advanced to the Semifinal Round (1st vs. 4th, 2nd vs. 3rd). The winners of the semifinal games then squared off in the Final.

Participating teams

1. The 2020–21 Panamanian Professional Baseball League season was canceled due to the ongoing COVID-19 pandemic. Panama still opted to participate in the Caribbean Series and selected the Federales franchise to represent them in the competition. The team had a mix of players from all four clubs in the league.

Preliminary round

Time zone: Mountain Standard Time (UTC–7)

Knockout stage

Semi-finals

Final

Awards

References

External links
Caribbean Series on mlb.com

2021
Caribbean Series
Caribbean Series
Caribbean Series
Caribbean Series
International baseball competitions hosted by Mexico
Caribbean Series
Caribbean Series
Mazatlán